Dinajpur-1 is a constituency represented in the Jatiya Sangsad (National Parliament) of Bangladesh since 2005 by Manoranjon Shill Gopal of the Awami League.

Boundaries 
The constituency encompasses Birganj and Kaharole upazilas.

History 
The constituency was created for the first general elections in newly independent Bangladesh, held in 1973.

Members of Parliament

Elections

Elections in the 2010s

Elections in the 2000s 

Abdullah Al Kafi died in September 2005. Independent candidate Manoranjon Shill Gopal was elected in a December by-election.

Elections in the 1990s

References

External links
 

Parliamentary constituencies in Bangladesh
Dinajpur District, Bangladesh